The International Journal of Acarology is a peer-reviewed scientific journal of agricultural, aquatic, general, medical, and veterinary acarology. Topics covered include mite and tick behavior, biochemistry, biology, biological pest control, ecology, evolution, morphology, physiology, systematics, and taxonomy. The journal was established in 1975 by Vikram Prasad. It was published by India Publishing House until 2008, when it was acquired by Taylor & Francis.

Notable contributors 

 Mercedes Delfinado

External links 
 

Acarology journals
Publications established in 1975
Bimonthly journals
Taylor & Francis academic journals
English-language journals